Dejan Šoškić (born 15 March 1967, Belgrade) is a Serbian economist who served as the governor of the National Bank of Serbia between 2010 and 2012. He is a full professor at the Faculty of Economics at the University of Belgrade.

Biography
In 1989, he graduated from the University of Belgrade, Faculty of Economics, where he also obtained his master's degree in 1993.

He completed his PhD degree in 1999 with his thesis, "Portfolio Management and Investment Funds: Economic and Statistical Analysis of US examples".

As a lecturer at graduate and MBA courses at the University of Nebraska, Omaha, Šoškić taught financial markets and institutions, financial management and international business and economics. In 2002, he was a guest lecturer at universities of New Haven, Rhode Island and Berkeley. He attended specialized financial market courses at US universities (in 1994, 1998 and 2002) and the Swiss National Bank (in 2001).

Šoškić is a Fulbright alumnus and member of the Presidency of the Scientific Association of Economists in Serbia. He served as a special financial markets adviser in the National Bank of Yugoslavia (2000–02), economic policy adviser in the EU Policy and Legal Advice Center (2002–03), and was a member of the Council of the National Bank of Serbia (2003–04) and its Chairman until 28 July 2010.

He authored the book Securities: Portfolio Management and Investment Funds, and co-authored Financial Markets and Institutions, Economic Statistics, and Stock Exchange Glossary. He has published more than 40 articles and papers in the field of financial markets and institutions and transition in Serbia.

He was appointed Governor of the National Bank of Serbia on 28 July 2010 by the National Assembly of the Republic of Serbia for a term of six years. He resigned the position on 2 August 2012 stating as the reason for his resignation the proposed amendments to the NBS Law, which in his opinion, substantially impair the independence of the NBS and open up the possibility of degradation and professional decision making within the NBS, which could stimulate the economic and financial instability in the country.

His resignation was adopted by National Assembly on 6 August 2012. He was succeeded by Jorgovanka Tabaković.

In November 2021, Šoškić stated that all data indicate that "corruption in Serbia is a very serious problem and that it is much more prevalent than in neighboring countries", which, as he stated, "repels investors and endangers both foreign and domestic investments".

See also 
Belgrade Faculty of Economics
National Bank of Serbia

References

External links

Šoškič: Serbia is not indebted („Politika“, 9 October 2010) in Serbian
Šoškić: I will disappoint speculators - interview („Politika“, 31 December 2010) in Serbian
Šoškić: No negotiations with the Government about loans - interview („NIN“, 23 June 2011) in Serbian
Serbia's Central Bank believes the country's GDP will grow 1.5% in 2012, says Governor Soskic („Balkans.com Business News“, 15 November 2011)

1967 births
Living people
Businesspeople from Belgrade
Politicians from Belgrade
Governors of the National Bank of Serbia
Serbian economists
University of Belgrade Faculty of Economics alumni